Banque Havilland S.A. is a private bank headquartered in Luxembourg. It is owned by the Rowland family and provides services in private banking, wealth and asset management, fund services to private clients and institutions. Banque Havilland has six offices; these are based in Luxembourg, Liechtenstein, Monaco, the United Kingdom, the United Arab Emirates and Switzerland.

History 
Banque Havilland obtained a banking licence in Luxembourg in 2009. David Rowland and his son Jonathan achieved this by obtaining the good bank of the failed Kaupthing Bank Luxembourg via their investment company Blackfish Capital. The bad bank was renamed Pillar Securitisation, for which Havilland acted as administrator.

It opened its first overseas entity in Monaco by acquiring Dexia Private Bank S.A.M. from Dexia Banque Internationale à Luxembourg in 2012. A year later, in 2013, it launched its London branch and acquired a majority stake in Banque Pasche (Liechtenstein) AG and 100% of shares in Pasche Bank & Trust Limited forming two new subsidiaries Banque Havilland (Liechtenstein) AG.

In 2016, Banque Havilland acquired Banque Pasche S.A. in Switzerland allowing it to start operating in Switzerland,  in Zurich. Moreover, through its acquisition of Banco Popolare Luxembourg S.A. from Banco Popolare, the bank extended its services to institutional clients.

Financial war against Qatar 

In November 2017, leaked emails purported to show that Yousef Al Otaiba, ambassador of the United Arab Emirates to the United States, had hired Banque Havilland to draw up a plan on how to start a financial war against Qatar. The bank has denied the allegations of overseas currency manipulation.

References 

Banks of Luxembourg